Ever Been to the Moon? is a 2015 Italian romantic comedy film written and directed  by Paolo Genovese and starring Raoul Bova  and Liz Solari. The theme song "Sei mai stata sulla Luna?" by Francesco De Gregori won the Nastro d'Argento for Best Song.

Plot 
Guia is young, very beautiful and a journalist who runs a fashion magazine between Milan and Paris. Working with her are her opportunistic partner Marco and her trusted collaborator Carola. When Guia's father dies, she inherits an old farm in Puglia. So she decides to go to the farm to sell this unusual inheritance for her, who is actually a snobbish and cynical woman. But it will prove to be not so simple, succeeding in the task of getting rid of it. Around the farm she will cross paths with many characteristic personalities: her cousin Pino (a great Neri Marcorè), an intellectually disabled man who in the end turns out to be the wisest of all; the farm's farmer Renzo who raises the child Toni; the two competing bartenders Felice and Delfo with their helper Mara, a disenchanted romantic always looking for love on the net but in a faraway country; Rosario, a butcher and real estate agent. Will Guia together with the trusty Carola and Mara herself manage to fool their temperament and their mistaken certainties and fall in love?

Cast 
 
 Raoul Bova as Renzo
 Liz Solari as Giulia
 Simone Dell'Anna as  Tony
 Giulia Michelini as Carola
 Pietro Sermonti as Marco
 Dino Abbrescia as  Dino
 Anna Rezan as Cinzia
 Nino Frassica as Oderzo
 Sabrina Impacciatore as Mara
 Neri Marcorè as Pino
 Rolando Ravello as Paolo 
 Sergio Rubini as Delfo
 Emilio Solfrizzi as Felice
 Paolo Sassanelli as Rosario

See also 
 List of Italian films of 2015

References

External links 

2015 romantic comedy films
Italian romantic comedy films
Films directed by Paolo Genovese
2010s Italian-language films
2010s Italian films